Marko Pajić (born October 13, 1992) is a Slovenian professional basketball player for KK Ilirija of the Slovenian First League and Alpe Adria Cup.
He is a 2.04 m (6 ft 8 in) tall power forward.

Professional career
In 2014, he signed for MZT Skopje but due to a back injury before the start of season 2014/2015, he terminated the contract with the Macedonian champion MZT Skopje.

He was a member of the Slovenia U18 team and Slovenia U20 team that played in Fiba Europe Under-18 and Under-20 Championship.

External links
 https://web.archive.org/web/20140810071002/http://www.mztskopjeaerodrom.mk/index.php/novosti-reader/items/nov-dogovor-za-luchi-george-cincadze-i-marko-paich-novi-igrachi-na-mzt-skope.html
 http://basketball.realgm.com/player/Marko-Pajic/Summary/25964

References

Basketball players from Ljubljana
Slovenian men's basketball players
1992 births
Living people
Power forwards (basketball)